Curt Marsh (born August 25, 1959) is a former American football offensive tackle. He was selected in the first round by the Oakland Raiders out of the University of Washington in the 1981 NFL Draft. Marsh was a High School All-American at Snohomish High School in Snohomish, Washington.  Marsh played for the Raiders through 1987. He underwent more than 20 surgeries for football-related injuries, including a foot amputation, which he attributes to inadequate medical care.

References

External links
NFL.com player page

1959 births
Living people
Players of American football from Tacoma, Washington
American football offensive tackles
Washington Huskies football players
Oakland Raiders players
Los Angeles Raiders players
American amputees